Ojuelos de Jalisco is a colonial town and municipality in the state of Jalisco, Mexico. The town's 1990 population was 7,265, although by the year 2010 it had increased to 11,881.

It sits at the junction of Mexico Highways 51, 70, and 80. 
The municipality is located in the North-Central region of Mexico. It is bordered by 3 states: Guanajuato, Zacatecas and Aguascalientes. Also, it is located in close proximity to the state of San Luis Potosi. All of the above makes of Ojuelos one of the municipalities with the most borders in Mexico. It also borders with the Lagos de Moreno municipality in the state of Jalisco.

History
The city was founded by Spanish conquistador Pedro Carrillo Davila in 1569, as a fortification or military garrison to protect travelers against the Chichimecas warriors. The fortification of Ojuelos was one of the seven ones built at the request of the Viceroy Martín Enriquez de Almanza in the important route Mexico-Zacatecas which later became the Camino Real de Tierra Adentro. The fortification in Ojuelos was the first being built and it is only one still in place. The decision to build the seven fortifications was made by Viceroy Enriquez de Almanza in response to deadly attacks made by Chichimecas commanded by their legendary leader Maxorro.

Ojuelos has a significant value in Colonial history in Mexico and North America, since its fortification is the only one which has survived to present day keeping its main structure as originally built in 1569. Currently, it houses the offices of the City Hall and a Library. 

In 1874, Ojuelos was designated as Municipality by Ignacio L. Vallarta, Governor of the State of Jalisco, after a long border dispute with the state of Zacatecas.

In 2010, Ojuelos was declared a World Heritage Site by UNESCO as part of the Camino Real de Tierra Adentro 2010.
Camino Real de Tierra Adentro was the Royal Inland Road, also known as the Silver Route. This UNESCO's World Heritage Site consists of a series of sites lying along a 1400 km section of this 2600 km route, that extends north from Mexico City to Texas and New Mexico, United States of America. The route was actively used as a trade route for 300 years, from the mid-16th to the 19th centuries, mainly for transporting silver extracted from the mines of Zacatecas, Guanajuato and San Luis Potosí, and mercury imported from Europe. Although it is a route that was motivated and consolidated by the mining industry, it also fostered the creation of social, cultural and religious links in particular between Spanish and Amerindian cultures. In the case of Ojuelos, the specific sites inscribed in the UNESCO Roster are the historic downtown of Ojuelos (Site 1351-018) including "El Fuerte", "El Parian" and other historic buildings, and the Bridge of Ojuelos "El Puente de Ojuelos" (Site 1351-019).

Tourism 

Architecture
 Among other touristic attractions, Ojuelos also has a plaza, El Parián, which is surrounded by 102 Gothic arches. El Parián was designed at the end of the 19th century by priest Luis G. Maciel.

 El Fuerte (Municipal Palace). Built in the 16th century.
 Hacienda de Ojuelos (typical hacienda house, which today is used as a training and meeting center for the parochial church).
 The Bridge of Ojuelos. Built in the 16th century

Churches
 Temple of San José.

Parks and reserves
 Cerro del Toro and the Mayal (Hill of the Bull and the Mayal).
 Cerro de Buenavista (Hill of Good View).

Handicrafts
 Manufacture of: wool serapes, pottery, and colonial furniture.

Treats
 Elaboration of eggnog (rompope) and prickly pear fruit sweet paste.

"Centre of Mexico"
 In the Plaza de Armas (Main Square) of Ojuelos (between the Municipal Presidency and the Parish Church of San José) there is a multicolored three-dimensional sign which reads, "OJUELOS" and below this word, in smaller white letters, the phrase "Corazón de México" (Heart of Mexico), and when searching in Google Maps the following: "Centro de México, Ojuelos", the website (or the Google Maps application) displays a satellite map with the legend: "Centro de México" and the image of a white silhouette-symbol of a photographic camera. By clicking or tapping on said camera, photographs of the main square of the town are opened, where there is a statue of a Christ with a crown of thorns, placed on a pedestal in the shape of a truncated quadrangular pyramid, and the aforementioned sign. Presumably this square  is the geographic centre of the United Mexican States, which is not true.

Hoaxes of this kind have been around for decades. The townsfolk of Tequisquiapan, Querétaro, boast of having the "geographic centre" of the country,  by agreement of 1916 of the first head of the Constitutionalist Army and in charge of the Federal Executive Power Venustiano Carranza. In May 1970, the municipal authorities of Tequisquiapan unveiled an allusive plaque. 

The city of Aguascalientes once also claimed to be the centre, and the authorities of that municipality placed a plaque in the Main Square of that city (no longer it is there).

For its part, the National Institute of Statistics and Geography (INEGI, Instituto Nacional de Estadística y Geografía) indicates that the geographic centre of Mexico, when taking into account only the continental extremes, is located at the following coordinates: , a point to the north-northwest of Nueva Pastoría, a town located in the Zacatecan municipality Villa de Cos.

But INEGI's calculation is based on averages of the means of the several longest straight lines that can be drawn between the extremes of the country.

Homero Adame Martínez, a researcher, traveler, and reporter of the magazine Mexico Desconocido (Unknown Mexico), calculated for the January 2000 issue of said publication, that the geographic centre of Mexico is located south of the Zacatecan town called Cañitas de Felipe Pescador, seat of the municipality of the same name, near a fork in the railroad Mexico City-Ciudad Juárez (hence, the eastern branch leads to Saltillo, Coahuila): .

Government

Municipal presidents

References

External links
 Government Tourism
 Municipality of Ojuelos
 Ojuelos city

Municipalities of Jalisco
1569 establishments in New Spain
Populated places established in 1569